Eublemma staudingeri  is a species of moth of the  family Erebidae. It is found in Eritrea, Niger, Nigeria, South Africa, Yemen and Zimbabwe.

References

Boletobiinae
Moths of Africa
Moths described in 1875